Mizuhanome (彌都波能売神 or みつはのめのかみ) is a God in Japanese mythology. She is a kami of water. She was born from the urine of Izanami.

Worship 
She is enshrined at Atago Shrine. Ashiya Shrine and Niukawakami Shrine are also dedicated to her.

Names 
She is also referred to as Mizuhanome or Itsu no Mitsuhanome no kami. In romaji her name is read as Mitsuhanomenokami.

The mitsu or mizu in her name means water and me is a feminine suffix. Her name is explained as water snake woman or water dragon woman.

In popular culture 

According to director Makoto Shinkai the name for the character Mitsuha Miyamizu from the movie Your Name is said to come from the goddess.

Related items 

 Family tree of Japanese deities
 Japanese gods
 Suijin
 Yoshikami God

See also 
 Id:Invaded

References 

Toilet deities
Water gods
Japanese goddesses
Kunitsukami